Muhterem Nur (née Aysel Muhterem Kısa; 31 December 1932 – 20 March 2020) was a Turkish film actress and pop music singer.

Personal life
She was born as Aysel Kısa on December 31, 1932, in Bitola, Vardar Banovina, Kingdom of Yugoslavia. She lost her 16-year-old mother at her birth and never knew her father. She was raised by her maternal aunt, whom she called "mother". She was renamed "Olga" as a result of Yugoslavian regime's assimilation campaign. All ethnic Turks and other Muslims in Yugoslavia were forced to adopt Christian names and renounce all Muslim customs.

In her infancy, she immigrated with her family members to Turkey and settled in Tekirdağ, northwestern Turkey. Later, due to financial problems, the family moved in 1942 to Istanbul to live in a small house at Eyüp district.

On the new identity card issued by the Turkish Government, she was named Aysel Muhterem Kısa. She spent her childhood in Eyüp, where she attended the primary school. After finishing the school, she began to work in a factory. Then, by chance, she got to know Suzan Yakar Rutkay, a notable female singer and partner of that time's biggest film production company, Halk Film. She helped Muhterem Nur step into cinema.

In 1961, Muhterem Nur married Işın Kaan (1937–1992), a journalist and actor. The couple divorced in 1963. She dated celebrities, such as movie directors Memduh Ün and Ümit Utku, and actors Yılmaz Duru, actors Cihat Aşkın and Efkan Efekan.

In 1982, she met Müslüm Gürses (1953–2013), a talented folk singer at that time, during a concert tour in Malatya, where she shared the stage with him. They started a quarrel the first evening. This also became the beginning of an ever-lasting deep love between the two. The couple got married in private, following  four-years together, on May 5, 1986. Her husband died on March 3, 2013, following a heart bypass surgery he underwent in November 2012.

Muhterem Nur died on 20 March 2020 at the İstinye State Hospital.

Career
Muhterem Nur debuted in cinema as a background actress in the 1951 movie, Yıldızlar Revüsü ("Revue of Stars"). She continued to play in movies as an extra, earning five times more than she received in the factory. She played as supporting actress in more than twenty movies before she got a lead role in the 1958 movie, Üç Arkadaş, in which she portrayed a blind girl. In the film directed by Memduh Ün, which became very successful, she shared the lead role with Fikret Hakan (born 1934). Thanks to her baby like face and naive acting artistry, she was rooted suddenly in the hearts of cinema fans, and climbed up the ladders very quickly.

Despite rising up to main actress roles in a very short time and playing in many movies, Muhterem Nur had difficulties continuing in cinema due to change of the era in movie themes during the period between 1965 and 1967. From 1965 on, she vocationally performed dancing and, from 1967, took the stage as a singer in low-priced music halls. In 1967, she was jailed for ten days because of unpaid bills. She confessed that once, in 1972, she was so destitute, she was unable to even buy a simit, Turkish bagel.

Muhterem Nur returned to cinema and starred sparsely in movies until 2002. Muhterem Nur is considered the first real star of Turkish cinema. She portrayed the ignored and discriminated-against woman, digressing from role of the bourgeoisie woman. She was known as the Yeşilçam's most weepy actress, who at the same time drew tears and made spectators tear handkerchiefs. Even though it is not documented, she is one of the most important female figures of Turkish cinema due to the box office record of her films shot in the 1950s and 1960s.

Works

Television series
 Yuva (1990)
 Dokuzuncu Hariciye Koğuşu (1985)
 Denizin Kanı (1978)

Television films
 Bir Akıllı Bir Deli (2002)
 Kuşlu Çorap (1988)

Cinema films 

Source:

References

External links
 

1932 births
2020 deaths
People from Bitola
Yugoslav emigrants to Turkey
Macedonian Turks
Turkish film actresses
Turkish women singers
Turkish pop singers
Best Supporting Actress Golden Boll Award winners
Golden Orange Life Achievement Award winners
20th-century Turkish actresses
Burials at Zincirlikuyu Cemetery